The Second Boer War was a war in South Africa between the independent states of the Orange Free State and the South African Republic against the British Empire, ultimately resulting in a British victory. During the war the Netherlands was largely pro-Boer, and some 2000 Dutch volunteers traveled to South Africa to fight for the two Boer republics. This support from the Dutch was due to the relationship between the Dutch and the Afrikaners (also called the Boers) who were mostly descended from the former Dutch colonists in South Africa.

During and after the Second Boer War  a number of monuments were erected in the Netherlands to commemorate this war.

The following list is not complete.

Boer Republics
Orange Free State
History of South Africa
History of Transvaal
Second Boer War
Monuments and memorials in the Netherlands